

Helmuth Schlömer (20 May 1893 – 18 August 1995) was a German general in the Wehrmacht during World War II and commanded the XIV Panzer Corps in the Battle of Stalingrad in 1943.

Helmuth Schlömer joint the army in March 1913 and was officer in World War I. After War he remained in the armed forced, then renamed to Reichswehr. When the Reichswehr was transformed to the Wehrmacht, he became teacher at the military school (Kriegsschule) in Munich. In World War II he took part in the Invasion of Poland, the Battle of France and the Siege of Leningrad. In 1942 he was promoted to Generalmajor and in January 1943 to Lieutenant general. At that time he fought in the Battle of Stalingrad as commander of the XIV Panzer Corps.

On 29 Jan 1943 Friedrich Paulus learned "Lieutenant-General Schlömer and other generals had received Red Army envoys and were negotiating a surrender with them." While in Soviet captivity he joined the National Committee for a Free Germany or NKFD and was released in 1949.

Awards and decorations

 Clasp to the Iron Cross (1939) 2nd Class (14 September 1939) & 1st Class (31 October 1939)
 Knight's Cross of the Iron Cross with Oak Leaves
 Knight's Cross on 2 October 1941 as Oberst and commander of Schützen-Regiment 5
 161st Oak Leaves on 23 December 1942 as Generalmajor and commander of 3. Infanterie-Division (mot.)

References

Citations

Bibliography

 
 

1893 births
1995 deaths
People from Minden
Lieutenant generals of the German Army (Wehrmacht)
German Army personnel of World War I
Recipients of the clasp to the Iron Cross, 1st class
Recipients of the Knight's Cross of the Iron Cross with Oak Leaves
German prisoners of war in World War II held by the Soviet Union
German commanders at the Battle of Stalingrad
People from the Province of Westphalia
20th-century Freikorps personnel
German centenarians
Men centenarians
Military personnel from North Rhine-Westphalia
German Army generals of World War II